Unordered map can refer to:
 Unordered associative containers (C++)
 Hash table
 Associative array